Aleksandr N. Pitchkounov (born May 6, 1979) is a former Russian heavyweight kickboxer and kyokushin karateka competing in K-1. He was the runner up at the K-1 World GP 2007 in Hawaii and K-1 World GP 2008 in Taipei  tournament.

Background
Pitchkounov began training in Kyokushin kaikan at age of 13 in 1993. He became a black belt in 1999 and started training kickboxing a year later after being interested by watching K-1-competitions. He finished third place in the 7th World Open Karate Tournament in Japan at the age of 20. During the tournament competition he knocked out Nicholas Pettas with a head kick.

Career
Pitchkounov made his K-1 debut in May of 2004, defeating Seth Petruzelli via TKO. After picking up two more wins in other promotions, he returned in 2005, defeating French fighter Rani Berbachi via decision. On November 19, 2005 at the K-1 World Grand Prix 2005 in Tokyo Final, Pitchkounov faced Pat Barry. The two fought to a draw, and had a rematch five months later, with Pitchkounov winning a close decision. 

In 2007, he returned to face Japanese fighter Hiraku Hori. Pitchkounov defeated Hori after three knockdowns in the first round, all with punches. 

In the quarterfinals of the K-1 World Grand Prix 2007 in Hawaii, he faced another Japanese fighter in Tatsufumi Tomihara. He won via third-round KO. In the semi-finals, he faced Pat Barry for a third time, winning a more clear-cut unanimous decision. 

In the final, Pitchkonouv faced Samoan Mighty Mo. The fight was highly exciting; Pitchkonouv scored an early knockdown from a wheel kick to the head, before being knocked down twice with barrages of punches from the Samoan. In the third round, Pitchkonouv was dropped again from a series of hooks, but rose again. After getting dropped a fourth time in the fight with a overhand right, the fight was stopped. 

Pitchkonouv fought twice more in 2007, defeating Tsuyoshi Nakasako and losing to Doug Viney via unanimous decision. He returned to K-1 in 2008, facing Chalid Arrab, whom he defeated via a close decision. After a decision over Nobu Hayashi in the quarterfinals, he faced Canadian MMA fighter Vaughn Anderson in the semi-finals. Greatly outmatching his opponent in size, Pitchkonouv won via first-round KO. In the finals of the 2008 K-1 World Grand Prix in Taipei, he faced fellow Russian Ruslan Karaev. After an errant low blow in the first round, Karaev knocked out Pitchkonouv with a left hook.

Titles
2008 K-1 World GP in Taipei Finalist
2007 K-1 World Grand Prix in Hawaii Runner-Up

Kickboxing record (incomplete)

See also 
List of K-1 events
List of K-1 champions
List of male kickboxers

External links
Official K-1 website
Aleksandr Pitchkounov K-1 profile

References

1979 births
Living people
Russian male kickboxers
Heavyweight kickboxers
Russian male karateka
Kyokushin kaikan practitioners
Sportspeople from Perm, Russia
Russian expatriates in Japan